Andrew Lamar Carter Jr. (born January 12, 1969) is an American lawyer serving as a United States district judge of the United States District Court for the Southern District of New York. He is a former United States magistrate judge of the United States District Court for the Eastern District of New York.

Early life and education
Born in Albany, Georgia, Carter received his Bachelor of Arts from the University of Texas at Austin in 1991 and his Juris Doctor in 1994 from Harvard Law School.

Career 
Carter was a program assistant at the Ford Foundation from 1994 to 1996. From 1996 until 2005, he was an attorney at the Legal Aid Society, working in the Federal Defender Division from 2000 to 2005 and in the Criminal Defense Division from 1996 to 2000. From 2005 to 2009 Carter worked for the Federal Defenders of New York.

Federal judicial service
In 2009, Carter was appointed a United States magistrate judge of the United States District Court for the Eastern District of New York. He remained in the post until taking up his lifetime appointment in the Southern District in 2011. Carter was recommended for an Article III judgeship by Senator Chuck Schumer of New York. On May 19, 2011, President Barack Obama nominated Carter to fill the Southern District of New York vacancy created when Judge Victor Marrero took senior status on December 31, 2010. On September 15, 2011, the Senate Judiciary Committee reported his nomination to the Senate floor by voice vote. The Senate confirmed his nomination on December 5, 2011, by voice vote. He received his commission on December 8, 2011.

Carter has presided over several high-profile cases, including the corruption trial of Norman Seabrook and a breach of contract/copyright infringement trial  involving the rapper Jay-Z.

See also 
 List of African-American federal judges
 List of African-American jurists

References

External links

1969 births
African-American judges
Harvard Law School alumni
Judges of the United States District Court for the Southern District of New York
Living people
People from Albany, Georgia
United States district court judges appointed by Barack Obama
21st-century American judges
United States magistrate judges
University of Texas at Austin alumni